The Turkish Wikipedia is the Turkish language edition of Wikipedia, spelled Vikipedi.

Turkish Wikipedia is the most popular Wikipedia in Turkey, with approximately 80 to 140 million pageviews depending the month and season. Turkish has a rapidly growing readership not only at the Turkish minorities living in the countries bordering Turkey, but also in Azerbaijan (more than 3 million pageviews per month) and Turkmenistan (where 250 thousand pageviews were recorded in July 2022), where Oghuz languages are spoken.

History
In January 2007, the Turkish Wikipedia was given the award for "Best Content" in this competition. The award was given in a ceremony on 25 January 2007 at Istanbul Technical University.

In 2015, its banner drawing attention to the gender bias on Wikipedia drew the attention of the Turkish media.

On 29 April 2017, the Turkish government blocked access to Wikipedia. While the reasons for the blockage were unrevealed, some believe that the encyclopedia had been blocked due to the Turkish government's concerns about articles critical of its actions regarding Turkey–ISIL cooperation. In December 2019, Turkey's highest court ruled that the ban violated freedom of expression. On 15 January 2020, the ban was lifted after 991 days.

Milestones 
 January 2004 — 100 articles
 July 2004 — 1,000 articles
 November 2005 — 10,000 articles
 March 2007 — ~55,000 articles
 February 2008 — 100,000 articles
 9 December 2012 — 200,000 articles
 27 April 2021 — 400,000 articles
 8 July 2022 — 500,000 articles

References

External links

  Turkish Wikipedia
  Turkish Wikipedia mobile version

Wikipedias by language
Wikipedia
Internet properties established in 2002
Wikipedia